Racinaea schumanniana is a plant species in the genus Racinaea. This species is native to Bolivia, Costa Rica and Ecuador.

References

schumanniana
Flora of Bolivia
Flora of Costa Rica
Flora of Ecuador